Statistics of National Association Foot Ball League in season 1908–09.

League standings

References
NATIONAL ASSOCIATION FOOT BALL LEAGUE (RSSSF)

1908-09
1908–09 domestic association football leagues
1908–09 in American soccer